Chandpala Anantapathpur is a census town within the jurisdiction of the Falta police station in the Falta CD block in the Diamond Harbour subdivision of the South 24 Parganas district in the Indian state of West Bengal.

Geography

Area overview
Diamond Harbour subdivision is a rural subdivision with patches of urbanization. Only 14.61% of the population lives in the urban areas and an overwhelming 85.39% lives in the rural areas. In the western portion of the subdivision (shown in the map alongside) there are 11 census towns. The entire district is situated in the Ganges Delta and the western part, located on the east bank of the Hooghly River, is covered by the Kulpi Diamond Harbour Plain, which is 5–6 metres above sea level. Archaeological excavations at Deulpota and Harinarayanpur, on the bank of the Hooghly River indicate the existence of human habitation more than 2,000 years ago.

Note: The map alongside presents some of the notable locations in the subdivision. All places marked in the map are linked in the larger full screen map.

Location
Chandpala Anantapathpur is located at

Demographics
According to the 2011 Census of India, Chandpala Anantapathpur had a total population of 5,286 of which 2,711 (51%) were males and 2,575 (49%) were females. There were 569 persons in the age range of 0–6 years. The total number of literate persons in Chandpala Anantapathpur was 3,634 (77.04% of the population over 6 years).

Infrastructure
According to the District Census Handbook 2011, Chandpala Anantapathpur covered an area of 3.3687 km2. Among the civic amenities, the protected water supply involved hand pumps. It had 503 domestic electric connections. Among the medical facilities it had 10 medicine shops. Among the educational facilities it had were 3 primary schools, 1 middle school, 1 secondary school, the nearest general degree college at Harindanga 2 km away. Three important commodities it produced were: paddy, zari work, cane baskets.

Transport
A short stretch of a local road links Chandpala Anantapathpur to the Falta-Fatepur Road.

Education
Vivek Sikshayatan is a Bengali-medium coeducational institution established in 1967. It has facilities for teaching from class V to class X.

Healthcare
Falta Block Primary Health Centre at Falta, with 10 beds, is the major government medical facility in the Falta CD block.

References

Cities and towns in South 24 Parganas district